Muscle Beach is a beach in Santa Monica, California.

Muscle Beach may also refer to:
Muscle Beach, a 1959 novel by Ira Wallach
Muscle Beach, a 1948 film directed by Joseph Strick and Irving Lerner
Muscle Beach, an outdoor fitness center on South Beach, Miami Beach

See also
Muscle Beach Party,  a 1964 film directed by William Asher
The Hustler of Muscle Beach, a 1980 film directed by Jonathan Kaplan